The Democracy Bridge 1954 or Seriprachathippatai 2497 Bridge (abbreviated as Seriprachathippatai Bridge) is a bridge across the Mun River in Ubon Ratchathani Province, northeast Thailand.

History

The construction began in 1953, the cost was eight million baht from the national budget by the Municipal Public Works Department (now Department of Public Works and Town & Country Planning) was a design agency and supervising the construction.

Construction was completed in 1954 with no welded steel frames with only three piers. It was the longest bridge in Thailand at that time.

The naming of the bridge was in accordance with government guidelines at the time (Phibul government), with anti-communist policies. Hence the name "Seriprachathippatai", which means "liberal democracy" and 1954, the year the bridge was opened (corresponds to 2497 according to the Buddhist calendar).

The bridge was rebuilt in 1992 on the original site due to deterioration over time, coincides with the year that Ubon Ratchathani marks the 200th anniversary.

It is now regarded as a bridge spanning the Mun River of Ubon Ratchathani paired with adjacent the Rattanakosin 200 Years Bridge, that built on the occasion of the 200th anniversary of Rattanakosin Kingdom (Bangkok) in 1982.

Cites

Bridges in Thailand
1954 establishments in Thailand
Bridges completed in 1954
Buildings and structures in Ubon Ratchathani province